Karen Glaser may refer to:

 Karen Glaser (photographer), American underwater photographer
 Karen Glaser (actress), English actress